Vicovu de Jos is a commune located in Suceava County, Bukovina, Romania. It is composed of a single village, Vicovu de Jos.

Notable residents
 Cristinel Gafița
 Pavel Țugui

References

Communes in Suceava County
Localities in Southern Bukovina
Duchy of Bukovina